John Harlan Stickell (July 31, 1913 – December 19, 1943) was an American aviator in the Royal Canadian Air Force and United States Navy during World War II.

Biography
Stickell was born in Gilson, Illinois, on July 31, 1913. He attended Bradley Polytechnic Institute for nearly two years before joining the Royal Canadian Air Force. Before the United States' entry into World War II, he served with  the Path Finding Force in England and received both the British Distinguished Flying Cross (gazetted 6 November 1942) and the Distinguished Service Order (gazetted 11 June 1943) for his outstanding service in heavy bomber missions over Germany.

He accepted an appointment as a lieutenant in the United States Naval Reserve, to date from March 29, 1943, and reported to Naval Forces, Europe, for active duty and transportation to the United States. Lt. Stickell was attached to the Bureau of Aeronautics from early April until late May, and then assigned to the Naval Air Training Center at Corpus Christi, Tex., for indoctrination in naval aircraft. He completed training on August 5 and, on the 19th, he reported to the Pacific Fleet Air Wing for duty. He was assigned to Bombing Squadron 108 (VB-108), based on Nukufetau Airfield in the Ellice Islands.

During his combat service, Lt. Stickell conducted search and reconnaissance missions during the Gilberts-Marshalls campaign. His skill and ability contributed to the destruction of three enemy planes, the sinking of an enemy boat and possibly of a cargo vessel. For the two actions in which these events occurred, Lt. Stickell was awarded the Distinguished Flying Cross and the Air Medal.

Lt. Stickell volunteered for a hazardous, two-plane bombing strike on December 13, 1943 against an underground oil storage tank located on Jabor at Jaluit Atoll in the Marshall Islands. Seriously wounded by an antiaircraft fire during the tree-top level approach, Lt. Stickell ignored his wounds and singlemindedly pursued his mission. His plane scored a direct hit on the target; but upon commencing the return flight, he was forced to relinquish the control of the plane to his copilot. Lt. Stickell died of his wounds six days later. For his gallantry and selfless sacrifice, he was posthumously awarded the Navy Cross.

Namesake
In 1945, the destroyer  was named in his honor.

Stickell Field on Eniwetok was also named in his honor.

See also

Genealogy Record at www.Stickels.org

References

1913 births
1943 deaths
United States Navy officers
Recipients of the Navy Cross (United States)
Recipients of the Distinguished Flying Cross (United States)
Companions of the Distinguished Service Order
Recipients of the Distinguished Flying Cross (United Kingdom)
People from Knox County, Illinois
Military personnel from Illinois
United States Navy pilots of World War II
Recipients of the Air Medal
United States Navy personnel killed in World War II
United States Navy reservists
Royal Canadian Air Force personnel of World War II